The 2017 Malaysian Grand Prix (formally known as the 2017 Formula 1 Petronas Malaysia Grand Prix) was a Formula One motor race that was held on 1 October 2017 at the Sepang International Circuit in Selangor, Malaysia. This was also the last Malaysian Grand Prix, as the race had not been contracted for the  season and beyond.

Mercedes driver Lewis Hamilton entered the round with a 28-point lead over Ferrari's Sebastian Vettel in the World Drivers' Championship. Hamilton's teammate Valtteri Bottas was third, a further 23 points behind. In the World Constructors' Championship, Mercedes held a lead of 102 points over Ferrari, with Red Bull Racing a further 143 points behind in third place.

Report

Background

Driver changes
Reigning GP2 Series champion Pierre Gasly made his Formula One debut, replacing Daniil Kvyat at Toro Rosso. The first free practice session saw several substitute drivers take part, including Sergey Sirotkin filling in for Nico Hülkenberg at Renault, Charles Leclerc replacing Marcus Ericsson at Sauber, Antonio Giovinazzi replacing Kevin Magnussen at Haas, and Sean Gelael taking the place of Carlos Sainz, Jr. at Toro Rosso.

Free practice
The second free practice was red-flagged after Romain Grosjean crashed heavily at Turn 14. Valtteri Bottas and Kimi Räikkönen dislodged a drain cover embedded in the apex of Turn 13. Grosjean, the next driver through, struck the cover which sliced into his rear wheel. This caused the rear tyre to immediately deflate as Grosjean put load onto the steering wheel, causing him to spin into the barrier on the outside of Turn 14. The third practice session was concluded with Kimi Räikkönen fastest but his teammate Sebastian Vettel had an engine problem that required a replacement.

Qualifying
Sebastian Vettel failed to set a time in Q1 as his replacement engine did not run properly meaning that he would start last on the grid. Championship leader Lewis Hamilton took pole position with a time of 1:30.076, ahead of Kimi Räikkönen and Max Verstappen.

Race

Kimi Räikkönen pulled off the grid due to a power unit issue. Hamilton got off well and Ricciardo, Bottas and Verstappen behind. Verstappen overtook Hamilton for the lead on lap 4, and led until lap 28 when he pitted, leaving Ricciardo in the lead. Ricciardo then also pitted and Verstappen retook the lead. Coming into the last laps, Hamilton tried fighting back but Verstappen won comfortably to take his second win in his career, a year after his previous at the 2016 Spanish Grand Prix.

Meanwhile, Vettel came back from last to 4th through the field, almost overtaking Ricciardo in third. He later collided with Lance Stroll on the cooldown lap, wrapping his left-rear tyre over the right side of the car. Pascal Wehrlein gave him a ride back to the paddock after the crash.

Classification

Qualifying

Notes
 – Sebastian Vettel failed to set a time within the 107% requirement, but received permission from the stewards to start the race; he also received a 20-place grid penalty for exceeding his quota of power unit components.

Race

Notes
 – Kimi Räikkönen did not line up on the grid as a result of a power unit issue.

Championship standings after the race

Drivers' Championship standings

Constructors' Championship standings

 Note: Only the top five positions are included for the sets of standings.
 Bold text and an asterisk indicates competitors who still had a theoretical chance of becoming World Champion.

References

Malaysian
Malaysian Grand Prix
Grand Prix
Malaysian Grand Prix